Trinemophora is a genus of silverfish in the family Protrinemuridae. Four species are currently known, two of them being Trinemophora schaefferi (Silvestri, 1905) from Chile and Trinemophora bitschiana (Wygodzinsky, 1959) from Turkey.

References

Further reading

 
 

Insect genera
Articles created by Qbugbot